Chassébuurt is a neighborhood of Amsterdam, Netherlands.

The Westermoskee is located in the neighborhood.

Amsterdam-West
Neighbourhoods of Amsterdam